"Une blonde platine dans la casbah" is a French-language song by Biyouna from the dual language French-Arabic album Blonde dans la Casbah (Arabic: شــقــراء فـي الـقـصــبــة). The music and lyrics were specially written for Biyouna by Jacques Duvall and Joseph Racaille. It has been released as a single which has since risen to become number one in several countries. The song is dedicated to the memory of her mother, 84 years old, who died the previous year.

The song commences: "Djemila devant son miroir, veut être la plus belle ce soir, elle se mue en princesse kabyle, revue par Cécile B De Mille."

References

2007 singles
2007 songs